The Toeplitz Hash Algorithm describes hash functions that compute hash values through matrix multiplication of the key with a suitable Toeplitz matrix. The Toeplitz Hash Algorithm is used in many network interface controllers for receive side scaling.

As an example, with the Toeplitz matrix  the key  results in a hash  as follows:

where the entries are bits and all operations are modulo 2. In implementations the highly redundant matrix is not necessarily explicitly stored.

References

Hash functions